School for Models (Spanish: Escuela de modelos) is a 1949 Cuban comedy film directed by José Fernández.

Partial cast
 Xonia Benguría 
 Alberto Garrido 
 Federico Piñero

References

Bibliography 
 Arturo Agramonte & Luciano Castillo. Ramón Peón, el hombre de los glóbulos negros. Editorial de Ciencias Sociales, 2003.

External links 
 

1949 films
1940s Spanish-language films
Cuban comedy films
1949 comedy films
Cuban black-and-white films